Susan Price (born 8 July 1955) is an English author of children's and young adult novels. She has won both the Carnegie Medal and the Guardian Prize for British children's books.

Price was born in Dudley, Worcestershire (now West Midlands).

Writing 

Many of Susan Price's works are fantasy, from science fiction to ghost stories; some are historical novels; others are about animals or everyday life. Many of her short stories are re-tellings of tales from folklore. Her first Ghost World novel, The Ghost Drum (1987), is an original fairy tale using elements from Russian history and Russian folklore. She won the Carnegie Medal from the Library Association, recognising The Ghost Drum as the year's best children's book by a British subject.

In The Sterkarm Handshake (1998) and its sequel A Sterkarm Kiss (2003), time travel brings together a young anthropologist from 21st century Britain and a young warrior from 16th century Scotland. They become lovers and she sides with his border clan in conflict with a 21st-century corporation. For the first book, Price won the Guardian Children's Fiction Prize, a once-in-a-lifetime award judged by a panel of British children's writers.

The Pagan Mars trilogy (2005–2008), also known as Odin or Mars, is set in a scientifically advanced alternative world where the pagan gods are still worshiped and slavery, called , is commonplace.

Bibliography

Novels - for older readers
city life (1974)
Twopence a Tub (1975)
Sticks and Stones (1976)
Home from Home (1977)
Christopher Uptake (1981)
From Where I Stand (1984)
 Ghost World
 The Ghost Drum (1987) — winner of the Carnegie Medal 
 Ghost Song (1992)
 Ghost Dance (1993)
Foiling the Dragon (1994)
Elfgift (1996)
Elfking (1996)
 Sterkarm
 The Sterkarm Handshake (1998) — winner of the Guardian Prize
 A Sterkarm Kiss (2003)
 A Sterkarm Tryst (2017)
The Ghost Wife (1999)
The Wolf-Sisters (2001)
The Bearwood Witch (2001)
 Pagan Mars
 Odin's Voice (2005)
 Odin's Queen (2006)
 Odin's Son (2008)
 Feasting the Wolf (2007)

Novels - for younger readers
The Devil's Piper (1973)
In a Nutshell (1983)
Odin's Monster (1986)
Master Thomas Katt (1988)
The Bone Dog (1989)
Phantom from the Past (1989)
A Feasting of Trolls (1990)
Thunderpumps (1990)
Knocking Jack (1992)
Coming Down To Earth (1994)
A True Spell and a Dangerous (1998)
The Saga of Aslak (1997)
Pedro (Piccadilly Pips) (1997)
Wolf's Footprint (2003)
Olly Spellmaker & the Sulky Smudge (2004)
Olly Spellmaker and the Hairy Horror (2004)
Olly Spellmaker: Elf Alert! (2005)

Short story collections
The Carpenter and Other Stories (1981)
Ghosts at Large (1984)
Ghostly Tales (1987)
Here Lies Price (1987)
Forbidden Doors (1991)
Head and Tales (1995)
Hauntings (1995)
Nightcomers (1997)
The Story Collector (1998)
Ghosts and Lies (1998)
Telling Tales (1999)
The Kings Head (2002)
The Fraid

As editor
Horror Stories (1988)
The Treasury of Nursery Tales (1991)
The Dark Side: Truly Terrifying Tales (2007)

References

Citations
Channel 4 Biography

External links

 

Susan Price at Fantastic Fiction

1955 births
Living people
People from Dudley
English children's writers
British writers of young adult literature
Women writers of young adult literature
English women novelists
20th-century English novelists
21st-century English novelists
20th-century English women writers
21st-century English women writers
English short story writers
British women short story writers
English fantasy writers
English science fiction writers
Women science fiction and fantasy writers
Carnegie Medal in Literature winners
Guardian Children's Fiction Prize winners